Shirley Scott (March 14, 1934 – March 10, 2002) was an American jazz organist. Her music was noted for its mixture of bebop, blues and gospel elements. She was known by the nickname "Queen of the Organ".

Life and career 
Scott was born in Philadelphia, Pennsylvania. Her father operated a jazz club in the basement of the family home and her brother played Saxophone. At the age of eight, Scott began piano lessons. After enrolling at Philadelphia High School for Girls, where she was awarded a scholarship, Scott switched to trumpet and played in the all-city schools band.

She studied for bachelor and master's degrees at Cheyney University. Later in life Scott would return to the university as a teacher.

As a performer in the 1950s, she played the Hammond B-3 organ. Her recordings with Eddie "Lockjaw" Davis included the hit "In the Kitchen". Influenced by gospel and blues, she played soul jazz in the 1960s with Stanley Turrentine, who became her husband during the same decade; the couple divorced in 1971.

Although organ trios declined in popularity during the 1970s, they resurged in the 1980s and she recorded again. In the 1990s, she recorded as pianist in a trio and performed at venues in Philadelphia.

Scott won an $8 million settlement in 2000 against American Home Products, the manufacturers of the diet drug fen-phen. She died of heart failure in 2002.

Discography

As leader
 1958: Great Scott! (Prestige)
 1958: Scottie (Prestige)
 1959: Scottie Plays the Duke (Prestige)
 1959: Soul Searching (Prestige)
 1958–60: Shirley's Sounds (Prestige) - released 1961
 1958–60: The Shirley Scott Trio (Moodsville)
 1960: Soul Sister (Prestige) - with Lem Winchester; released 1966
 1960: Mucho, Mucho (Prestige) - with The Latin Jazz Quintet
 1960: Like Cozy (Moodsville) - released 1962
 1961: Satin Doll (Prestige) - released 1963
 1958–61: Workin' (Prestige) - released 1967
 1960–61: Stompin' (Prestige) - released 1967
 1961: Hip Soul (Prestige) - with Stanley Turrentine
 1961: Blue Seven (Prestige) - with Oliver Nelson, Joe Newman; released 1966
 1961: Hip Twist (Prestige) - with Stanley Turrentine
 1961: Shirley Scott Plays Horace Silver (Prestige)
 1962: Happy Talk (Prestige) - also released as Sweet Soul in 1965.
 1963: The Soul Is Willing (Prestige) - with Stanley Turrentine
 1963: Drag 'em Out (Prestige)
 1963: For Members Only (Impulse!) - with Oliver Nelson
 1963: Soul Shoutin' (Prestige) - with Stanley Turrentine
 1964: Travelin' Light (Prestige) - with Kenny Burrell
 1958–64: Now's the Time (Prestige) - released 1967
 1964: Blue Flames (Prestige) - with Stanley Turrentine
 1964: Great Scott!! (Impulse!) - with Oliver Nelson
 1964: Everybody Loves a Lover (Impulse!) - with Stanley Turrentine
 1964: Queen of the Organ [live] (Impulse!) - with Stanley Turrentine
 1965: Latin Shadows (Impulse!) - with Gary McFarland
 1966: On a Clear Day (Impulse!)
 1966: Roll 'Em: Shirley Scott Plays the Big Bands (Impulse!) - with Oliver Nelson
 1966: Soul Duo (Impulse!) - with Clark Terry
 1967: Girl Talk (Impulse!)
 1968: Soul Song (Atlantic) - with Stanley Turrentine
 1969: Shirley Scott & the Soul Saxes (Atlantic) - with King Curtis, Hank Crawford, David "Fathead" Newman
 1970: Something (Atlantic)
 1971: Mystical Lady (Cadet)
 1972: Lean on Me (Cadet)
 1973: Superstition (Cadet) - with Richard Evans
 1974: One for Me (Stata East) - with Harold Vick, Billy Higgins
 1978: The Great Live Sessions (ABC/Impulse!) [2LP] - with Stanley Turrentine; recorded 1964
 1989: Oasis (Muse)
 1991: Great Scott! (Muse)
 1991: Blues Everywhere (Candid)
 1991: Skylark (Candid)
 1992: A Walkin' Thing (Candid) - with Terell Stafford, Tim Warfield

LP/CD compilations

 1969: The Best of Shirley Scott With Stanley Turrentine (Prestige PR 7707)
 1970: The Best of Shirley Scott With Stanley Turrentine/For Beautiful People (Prestige PR 7773)
 1993: Workin'  (Prestige) (compilation of Workin'  + Stompin' ) 			
 1994: Soul Shoutin'  (Prestige) (compilation of The Soul Is Willing + Soul Shoutin' )						
 1998: Legends of Acid Jazz: Shirley Scott (Prestige) (compilation of Hip Soul + Hip Twist)
 1998: Stanley Turrentine & Shirley Scott: Priceless Jazz (GRP) (includes 3 tracks from Scott's Queen of the Organ and 5 tracks from Turrentine's Let It Go, both originally on Impulse!)						
 1999: Soul Sister (Prestige) (compilation of Soul Sister + Travelin' Light)
 2001: Like Cozy (Prestige) (compilation of The Shirley Scott Trio + Like Cozy)
 2001: Shirley Scott: Talkin' Verve (Verve) (includes tracks from 9 albums: Impulse! AS-9051/AS-9067/AS-9073/AS-9093/AS-9115/AS-9119/AS-9133/AS-9141 and Cadet CA-50009)
 2003: Shirley Scott Memorial Album (1958–1964) (Prestige)			
 2004: Trio Classics, Vol. 1 (Prestige) (compilation of Great Scott! + Shirley's Sounds)

As sidewoman

With Stanley Turrentine
 1961: Dearly Beloved (Blue Note)
 1963: Never Let Me Go (Blue Note)
 1963: A Chip Off the Old Block (Blue Note)
 1964: Hustlin' (Blue Note)
 1966: Let It Go (Impulse!)
 1968: Common Touch (Blue Note)

With Mildred Anderson
 1960: Person to Person (Bluesville)
With Eddie "Lockjaw" Davis
 1956–57: Jazz With A Beat (King)
 1957: Count Basie Presents Eddie Davis Trio + Joe Newman (Roulette)
 1958: Eddie Davis Trio Featuring Shirley Scott, Organ (Roulette)
 1958: The Eddie Davis Trio Featuring Shirley Scott, Organ (Roost)
 1958: The Eddie "Lockjaw" Davis Cookbook, Vol. 1 (Prestige) 
 1958: Jaws (Prestige)
 1958: The Eddie "Lockjaw" Davis Cookbook, Vol. 2 (Prestige)
 1959: Very Saxy (Prestige) - with Buddy Tate, Coleman Hawkins, Arnett Cobb
 1959: Jaws in Orbit (Prestige) 
 1959: Bacalao (Prestige)
 1960: Eddie "Lockjaw" Davis with Shirley Scott (Moodsville)
 1961: The Eddie "Lockjaw" Davis Cookbook Volume 3 (Prestige) - recorded 1958
 1963: Misty (Moodsville) - recorded 1959–60
 1964: Smokin' (Prestige) - recorded 1958
With Jimmy Forrest
 1978: Heart of the Forrest (Palo Alto)
With Dexter Gordon
 1982: American Classic (Elektra/Musician)
With Al Grey
 1977: Al Grey Jazz All Stars: Travelers Lounge Live (Travelers)
 1979: Al Grey/Jimmy Forrest Quintet: Live at Rick's (Aviva)
With Joe Newman
 1958: Soft Swingin' Jazz (Coral)
With Jimmy Rushing 
 1967: Every Day I Have the Blues (BluesWay)
With Al Smith
 1959: Hear My Blues (Bluesville)

References

External links

Shirley Scott discography by Doug Payne
Shirley Scott discography at Jazzlists
 – last filmed public performance playing with Joey DeFrancesco at an organ summit in her honor in 1999
Shirley Scott obituary by The Scotsman, accessed July 4, 2012

1934 births
2002 deaths
American jazz organists
Women organists
Hard bop organists
Musicians from Pittsburgh
Musicians from Philadelphia
Soul-jazz organists
Strata-East Records artists
Muse Records artists
Prestige Records artists
Impulse! Records artists
20th-century American keyboardists
20th-century organists
Jazz musicians from Pennsylvania
20th-century women musicians